New College West is the sixth residential college at Princeton University.  The construction of New College West will help increase the undergraduate student body population by 10 percent, or 500 students. It aims to be LEED Gold certified. Deborah Berke Partners are the architects of the new buildings. New College West will be built adjacent to New College East, and share the same dining facility. New College West will house students displaced by the demolition of First College, which is to be replaced with Hobson College in 2026.

Perelman family donation

The college was originally made possible by a $65 million gift from the Perelman Family Foundation, run by Debra '96 and Ronald Perelman. Prior to the removal of the Perelman name in 2021, it would have been the first residential college at Princeton to be named after Jewish people. 

In June 2021, Princeton University removed the Perelman name from New College West after the Perelman Family Foundation ceased payments to the University under their gift agreement.

References

Colleges of Princeton University
2022 establishments in New Jersey
University and college buildings completed in 2022